William Moreton Condry MA, MSc (1 March 1918 – 30 May 1998), was a naturalist who was born in Birmingham, England. 

He earned degrees from the University of Birmingham, in French, from the University of London, in Latin, and from Aberystwyth University, in history.

Like his parents, he was a pacifist, and, being a conscientious objector worked as a forester in Herefordshire during World War II. He married a woman called Penny in 1946. The next year the West Wales Field Society (later the Dyfed Wildlife Trust) appointed him as their warden for Mid Wales, a post he held until 1956. He also edited their journal, Field Notes.

He was warden at the Royal Society for the Protection of Birds's  reserve from its inception in 1969, until his in 1982, he and Penny having lived at Ynys Edwin cottage there since 1959 at the invitation of Hugh Mapin, the owner of the estate. Condry was one of the main forces in the preservation of the red kite in Wales. He wrote many guides and nature books, including two volumes in Collins' New Naturalist series, Snowdonia National Park (1966) and The Natural History of Wales (1984). Pathway to the Wild (1975) and Wildlife My Life (1995) are autobiographical.

He contributed, fortnightly, to The Guardians Country Diary column for over forty years, and appeared on several BBC Radio programmes.

He received an honorary MSc from the University of Wales in 1980, and held the position of Vice-President of the West Wales Naturalists' Trust from 1982. 

He died from kidney failure on 30 May 1998, at Morriston Hospital. Following cremation at Aberystwyth, his ashes were scattered on Cadair Idris.

Works

References 

1918 births
1998 deaths
English ornithologists
British nature writers
People associated with the University of Wales
New Naturalist writers
20th-century British zoologists
British pacifists
English conscientious objectors
People from Birmingham, West Midlands
Alumni of the University of Birmingham
Alumni of the University of London
Alumni of Aberystwyth University